Verrucospora is a genus of fungi in the family Agaricaceae.

Agaricaceae
Agaricales genera